William Ray Bonner (born March 28, 1948) is a former service station attendant who went on a shooting spree through the South Side area of Los Angeles, California on April 22, 1973, killing six people and wounding nine others. The rampage ended with his arrest after he had been injured in a shootout with police.

Bonner was sentenced to life imprisonment later the same year and is currently an inmate at California State Prison in Vacaville.

Shooting spree
The shooting began at Bonner's home at approximately 2:35 p.m. after he had gotten into an argument with Otha Leavitt, a friend of his mother, who had paid them a short visit to make a phone call. Enraged, he went outside and, with a handgun, fired a shot each at 16-year-old Anthony Thomas and 17-year-old Carolyn Cleveland, who had accompanied Mrs. Leavitt and waited in her car. Leaving the two teenagers severely wounded Bonner returned inside and killed Otha Leavitt with a shot in the head, before hijacking her Plymouth Valiant, which by then had been vacated by Thomas and Cleveland.

Armed with his handgun and a 20-gauge pump-action shotgun, Bonner drove to a gas station about 1.5 miles from his home, where he had been employed previously as a service station attendant. Arriving there at about 2:43 p.m. he approached the occupants of a Chevrolet Impala, 18-year-old Vicky Wells and her 13-year-old sister Aileen, both known to him since their early childhood. He shot Vicky in the back with his shotgun, critically wounding her and killed Aileen, also by a shot in the back, when she was running towards the service area.

Bonner then sped away to another nearby gas station, his workplace until one week prior to the shooting spree, where he arrived at 2:45 p.m. Carrying his shotgun he entered the service bay area where he called out for his friend and former colleague, Raleigh Henderson, who had helped him get the job there. When Henderson turned around Bonner shot him once in the stomach and then fired again when Henderson exclaimed "What have I done?" Pointing at the body on the floor Bonner asked service station attendant James Morrow: "Do you know if anyone wants some of that?" He approached a female customer, fired a shot in the air and then left for the home of Jevie Thompson, with whose son, Vernon, he’d had an argument with the night before. Bonner arrived there about 5 minutes later and killed Jevie Thompson with a shotgun blast in the stomach, and critically wounded his wife, Eddie Mae, as well as his 15-year-old son Alfred.

Bonner's next stop was Smitty's Drive-In Liquors, where he appeared at 3:14 p.m. Believing he had been short-changed there once, he killed the shop owner, Smitty Sneed, again with a shot in the stomach, and wounded a customer, 58-year-old Duly Oscar Bennett, in the shoulder, before heading towards Liquorama Liquors, where he shot and critically wounded 23-year-old employee Robert L. Smith with a shot in the stomach, and hit 28-year-old Roosevelt D. Jenkins, another employee, in the leg.

A couple of minutes later Bonner barged into the house of his former girlfriend, 22-year-old Diane Lore Andrea, who had taken the side of Vernon Thompson during the argument the day before, and ended their relationship afterwards. He shot her in the neck with his shotgun, severing her jugular vein and spinal cord. She died instantly.

Chase and arrest
Bonner eluded police until 3:25 p.m. when he was spotted in his car by two patrolling police officers, blocking their way out of an alley. Bonner pointed his shotgun at them and repeatedly pulled the trigger, but when it failed to shoot he threw it away and sped off, while the police officers fired four shots at him and initiated pursuit. When Bonner crashed his Plymouth into the rear of the car of 45-year-old Mary Felton, who had stopped at a traffic light, he jumped out of his own vehicle and into the back seat of hers. Threatening her and her two daughters with his pistol he ordered her to drive.

The scene was observed by security guard Versell Bennett who then took up pursuit in his car and eventually managed to force them to stop. Bennett then left his vehicle armed with his shotgun and opened fire at Bonner, who then shot at him in return. When police finally caught up with Bonner, a shootout ensued in which he was hit five times in his legs and lower body.  Some officers apparently aimed their fire at Bennett first, mistaking him for the gunman. He was hit twice in the head and shoulders and succumbed to these wounds four days later. Mrs. Felton also suffered minor injuries in the shoulder. At 3:29 p.m. Bonner was taken into custody and brought to Los Angeles County+USC Medical Center for treatment.

Perpetrator
Bonner was described by his neighbors and acquaintances as a nice and quiet young man who kept to himself. According to a former coworker at a gas station he never caused any trouble there, stating that, in some respects, he was one of the best. Herman English, who would later become his defense attorney and knew him for 10 years, said of Bonner that he had been a submissive, kind and easy going person, but after the shooting was "completely different mentally."

According to police files Bonner had been arrested six times since 1966 in connection with narcotics, assault and grand theft auto. In the most serious case he was sentenced to three years probation for assaulting a police officer.

Bonner's father, James A. Bonner, related to a newspaper that his son had connections to "some kind of Mafia gang" which had made threats against him and his family in the days prior to the shooting.

Victims
Diane Lore Andrea, 22, Bonner's girlfriend
Versell Bennett, 58, security guard, accidentally shot by police
Raleigh "Butch" Henderson, 33, friend of Bonner
Otha Leavitt, 53, friend of Bonner's mother
Smitty B. Sneed, 58, owner of Smitty's Drive-In Liquors
Jevie D. Thompson, 57
Aileen Wells, 13

Trial and conviction
Preliminary hearings for the case opened in July and on August 21 Bonner was formally charged with seven counts of murder, eight counts of assault with a deadly weapon and three counts of kidnapping, whereupon he pleaded innocent and innocent by reason of insanity. On November 13 Bonner changed his mind and pleaded guilty to one count each of first degree murder, second degree murder and assault with a deadly weapon and a month later, on December 17, he was sentenced to life imprisonment.

As of November 2016, he is still an inmate at California State Prison in Solano.

See also
 List of rampage killers in the United States
 List of homicides in California

References

External links
Rampaging Gunman Leaves 6 Dead, 10 Hurt; Seized by Police, Los Angeles Times (April 23, 1973)
Shooting Toll Rises to Seven, Los Angeles Times (April 28, 1973)
6 Reported Killed In Shooting Spree By Gunman on Coast, The New York Times (April 23, 1973)
Guard Dies on Coast, The New York Times (April 28, 1973)
California man is charged in murders of six persons, Jet (May 10, 1973)
"This man must have been sick": court psychiatrist, Jet (May 17, 1973)

1948 births
1973 murders in the United States
American murderers of children
American prisoners sentenced to life imprisonment
American spree killers
April 1973 events in the United States
Crimes in California
Criminals from Los Angeles
Living people
Mass murder in 1973
Mass shootings in the United States
Murder in California
People convicted of murder by California
Place of birth missing (living people)
American people convicted of murder
American people convicted of assault